The Delaware United States House election for 1789 was held on January 7, 1789.  The former Continental Congressman John Vining won the election and became Delaware`s first Representative to the House of Representatives.

Results

See also 
 United States House of Representatives elections, 1788 and 1789
 List of United States representatives from Delaware

References

Delaware
1789
1789 Delaware elections